Syn Studio is a private art school located in Montreal, Quebec, Canada. It was founded in 2007 by Anthony Walsh. The school is located in Downtown Montreal at 460 rue Ste-Catherine Ouest. Syn Studio specializes in concept art and illustration for the entertainment industry. Syn Studio was ranked the number 1 school worldwide for Concept Art and Illustration by The Rookies in 2020.

Programs
Syn Studio Concept Art School offers an 18-month diploma program in Concept Art, recognized by The Ministry of Education, Higher Education and Research of Quebec as an Attestation of College Studies. It also offers a non-accredited Art Bootcamp program as well as individual online art classes.

History
Founded in 2007 as Galerie Synesthésie, the school changed its name to Syn Studio in 2011. In June 2014, the Syn Studio ran a Concept Art & Design Masterclass with American concept artist Scott Robertson. On May 1, 2015 Syn Studio hosted a Comics Salon event in celebration of Free Comic Book Day. In May 2020, Syn Studio launched its brand new Online Art Classes

Notable faculty 
Some of the past and current notable faculty members at Syn Studio include:
 Frederic Bennett – senior concept artist known for his work on Deus Ex
 Simon Bertrand – Quebecois fine artist
Christian Robert de Massy – concept artist who worked on X-Men: Days of Future Past, X-Men: Apocalypse and The Curious Case of Benjamin Button
Max Douglas – comic book creator who worked on Marvel titles Dr. Strange and Spider-Man 2099
André Pijet – Polish cartoonist known for his hockey themed cartoons from the 90s
 Frédéric St-Arnaud – matte painter and concept artist who worked on Pan, Pacific Rim, and Elysium

See also 
 Higher education in Quebec
 Video gaming in Canada

References

External links 
 

Schools in Montreal
Art in Montreal
Art schools in Canada
2007 establishments in Canada